Bairabi railway station  serves Bairabi city in Kolasib district, Mizoram. Its code is BHRB. The station consists of 3 platforms. Bairabi is one of the railhead of Mizoram and connected with a broad-gauge line.

Future development plans
 Bairabi Sairang Railway is a proposed railway line from Bairabi station to Sairang railway station near Aizawl with an estimated cost of Rs 2,384 crore. The Bairabi-Sairang rail link will require construction of 130 bridges, 23 tunnels and four stations namely Hortoki, Kawnpui, Mualkhang and Sairang. The cost of Construction from Bairabi to Sairang is estimated at 2384 Crores. As of August 2019, the 60% work is complete, and the revised expected deadline is December 2021.
 Future line development plan entails extending the line from Aizawl to south to Zochawchhuah (India)-Zorinpui (Myanmar) on the India–Myanmar border, from where it will then be extended to 90 km-long "Sittwe-Kyaukhtu railway to connect it to Sittwe Port as part of Kaladan Multi-Modal Transit Transport Project. "Zochawchhuah(Zorinpui)-Sairang railway" in India, survey for the 375 km line rail line from Sairang (Aizawl) to Hmawngbuchhuah on border near Zochawchhuah–Zorinpui was completed in August 2017 and it will be constructed in future phase. Kyaukhtu–Zorinpui railway line is 200 km long planned but not yet surveyed line.
 Other future extension spur is from Aizawl to east of Zokhawthar. Future line development plan entails extending the line from Imphal to Moreh on the India–Myanmar border, from where it will then be extended to the existing railhead at Kalay (also called Kale and Kalemyo) in Myanmar to form part of the ambitious Trans-Asian Railway.

See also

 Rail transport in India

References

External links

 Ministry of Indian Railways, Official website

Railway stations in Kolasib district
Lumding railway division